Jason M. Barr is an American economist and author, at Rutgers University-Newark, whose work is in the field of “skynomics,” the study of skyscrapers and skylines using modern economics methods. He is the author of Building the Skyline: The Birth and Growth of Manhattan’s Skyscrapers which chronicled the history of the Manhattan skyline from an economic perspective. Barr earned his B.S. from Cornell University in 1992, his M.F.A. in creative writing from Emerson College in 1995 and his Ph.D. in economics from Columbia University in 2002.

Barr's work has addressed widely held myths or misconceptions about skyscrapers and cities.   For example, research performed by Barr and his colleagues showed that there was no evidence for the Skyscraper Curse,  that the completion of the world's tallest building is a herald of an economic crisis. Barr has also debunked the misconception that Manhattan's geological conditions have been the reason there are few skyscrapers between lower Manhattan and Midtown. Rather, Barr's work demonstrates that Midtown's origin was due to the city's demographic evolution and the fact that Manhattan is a long, but narrow, island that concentrated economic activity to a much greater degree, as compared to other cities. Barr is an advocate of land reclamation projects such as those seen in Hong Kong, the Netherlands. On January 14, 2022 Barr wrote an opinion article in the New York Times  which proposed the expansion of Manhattan Island. This "New Mannahatta" project proposal was met with criticism from readers despite the project being quite similar to other already completed projects around the world.

Books 

 Building the Skyline: The Birth and Growth of Manhattan's Skyscrapers. Oxford University Press, 2016. 
 Economic Drivers: Skyscrapers in China. Council on Tall Buildings and Urban Habitat, 2017. .

References

External links 
 Building the Skyline - The Birth & Growth of Manhattan's Skyscrapers
 Building the Skyline: The Birth and Growth of Manhattan's Skyscrapers
 Manhattan Skyline | C-SPAN.org
 Skynomics Blog

Year of birth missing (living people)
Living people
American economists
American economics writers